Rithvik Raja (born 9 March 1989) is a Carnatic Musician (South Indian Classical Music) from India. He has performed in concerts in India and overseas. Since January 2016, Rithvik is married to Bharatanatyam artiste Shweta Prachande.

Early life and background 

Rithvik Raja was born in Chennai, Tamil Nadu, India. He began learning Carnatic music at the age of 5. He had his initial training under Sudha Raja (his mother) for vocal music. Subsequently, after developing a good understanding of the basics and foundation for 6 years, he was trained by Sulochana Pattabhiraman for 2 years. At the age of 13, he started learning from T.M. Krishna, who is one of the leading figures in the Carnatic music circuit today. Training under Krishna has given Rithvik a larger perspective of music and a passion to strive harder in innovating and excelling within the boundaries of classicism.

Education 

His schooling in Vidya Mandir Senior Secondary School, Mylapore, Chennai. He went on to receive his B.A. degree in Economics from Ramakrishna Mission Vivekananda College, Madras. He also completed a one year Multimedia course from Image Infotainment, Alwarpet. He is currently studying for a degree in Sound Engineering at SAE Institute of Technology.

Career 
Rithvik has been giving public performances and concerts since a very young age. Today, he has performed in all the leading institutions in places such as Chennai as well as Mumbai, Calcutta, Bangalore, Delhi and other places in India. He has also toured Malaysia, Singapore, Sri Lanka. Apart from performances, he currently heads as the President of an organisation called The Youth Association for Classical Music that deals with spreading the awareness of Classical Music among the youth. Rithvik is known for his solid voice with perfect pitch, mastery over laya and adherence to classicism.

Rithvik's music and his commitment to the artform have led him to tour and perform in a number of esteemed venues across the globe. His has recently completed tours in New Zealand, Abu Dhabi, Malaysia to name a few.

Awards and titles 

 Bala Rasika Award 2004 - Carnatica, Chennai
 Best Male Vocalist Award 2005 - RA Puram Bhaktha Jana Sabha, Chennai
 Most Promising Youngster Award 2006 - Ganamukundapriya, Chennai
 Best Concert Award 2007 - VDS Arts Academy, Chennai
 Best Junior Vocalist Award 2008 - Narada Gana Sabha, Chennai
 Best Male Vocalist Award 2009 - Parthasarathy Swami Sabha, Chennai
 Best Ragam Tanam Pallavi Award 2011 - Music Forum, Chennai
 Best Male Sub-Senior Vocalist 2011 - Parthasarathy Swami Sabha, Chennai
 Maharajapuram Santhanam Award 2012 - Krishna Gana Sabha, Chennai
 Isai Chudar 2012 - Kartik Fine Arts, Chennai
 Yuva Kala Bharathi 2012 - Bharat Kalachar, Chennai

References

External links 
 Rithvik Raja
 Youth Association for Classical Music
 YACM Interview
 Article on Core Values of Classical Music
 Influence of Internet on students of Arts
 Article on YACM's 25th Anniversary
 Article on Youth influence in Carnatic Music
 Rithvik sharing with his counter parts from the North
 Rithvik interviewed about Pallavi singing in a concert
 Rithvik & his designing interests

1989 births
Living people
Male Carnatic singers
Carnatic singers